Martin R. Bradley (April 1, 1888 – December 21, 1975) was a Democratic politician from Michigan who served in the Michigan House of Representatives, including as Speaker during the 57th Legislature. He was the first Speaker to come from the Upper Peninsula and sponsored the legislation which created the Michigan Legislative Council (as Speaker, he served as its first chairman).

Prior to his election to the House, Bradley was a school teacher in Huron County, later moving to Hermansville and serving as the superintendent of schools and as postmaster. He was also a delegate to the 1932 Democratic National Convention which nominated Franklin D. Roosevelt for President of the United States. In 1935, Bradley was appointed the customs collector for Michigan and made his home in Detroit.

Bradley died on December 21, 1975 in Leavenworth, Washington.

References

1888 births
1975 deaths
Speakers of the Michigan House of Representatives
Democratic Party members of the Michigan House of Representatives
Schoolteachers from Michigan
School superintendents in Michigan
People from Newberry, Michigan
People from Menominee County, Michigan
20th-century American politicians
20th-century American educators